This is a list of main career statistics of Italian professional tennis player Fabio Fognini. All statistics are according to the ATP World Tour and ITF websites.

Performance timelines

Only main-draw results in ATP Tour, Grand Slam tournaments, Davis Cup/ATP Cup/Laver Cup and Olympic Games are included in win–loss records.

Singles
Current through the 2023 Rio Open.

Doubles

Significant finals

Grand Slam finals

Doubles: 1 (1 title)

Masters 1000 finals

Singles: 1 (1 title)

Doubles: 3 (3 runner-ups)

ATP career finals

Singles: 19 (9 titles, 10 runner-ups)

Doubles: 20 (8 titles, 12 runner-ups)

ATP Challenger Tour and ITF Futures finals

Singles: 13 (9 titles, 4 runner–ups)

Doubles: 3 (1 titles, 2 runner–ups)

Grand Slam seedings

Record against other players

Record against top 10 players

|-
|align=left colspan=7|Number 1 ranked players

|-
|align=left colspan=7|Number 2 ranked players

|-
|align=left colspan=7|Number 3 ranked players

|-
|align=left colspan=7|Number 4 ranked players

|-
|align=left colspan=7|Number 5 ranked players

|-
|align=left colspan=7|Number 6 ranked players

|-
|align=left colspan=7|Number 7 ranked players

|-
|align=left colspan=7|Number 8 ranked players

|-
|align=left colspan=7|Number 9 ranked players

|-
|align=left colspan=7|Number 10 ranked players

Record against players ranked No. 11–20
Active players are in boldface. 

  Albert Ramos Viñolas 9–2
  Andreas Seppi 5–4
  Pablo Cuevas 4–2
  Viktor Troicki 4–2
  Marcel Granollers 4–4
  Paul-Henri Mathieu 3–1
  Marco Cecchinato 3–1
  Guido Pella 3–3
  Benoît Paire 3–3
  Philipp Kohlschreiber 3–7
  Borna Ćorić 2–0
  Kyle Edmund 2–0
  Sam Querrey 2–0
  Frances Tiafoe 2–0
  Reilly Opelka 2–1
  Bernard Tomic 2–2
  Juan Ignacio Chela 1–0
  Hyeon Chung 1–0
  Alex de Minaur 1–0
  Dominik Hrbatý 1–0
  Jerzy Janowicz 1–0
  Aslan Karatsev 1–0
  Nikoloz Basilashvili 1–1
  Jarkko Nieminen 1–1
  Fabrice Santoro 1–1
  Dmitry Tursunov 1–1
  Feliciano López 1–3
  Alexandr Dolgopolov 1–5
  José Acasuso 0–1
  Ivo Karlović 0–1
  Xavier Malisse 0–1
  Igor Andreev 0–2
  Nick Kyrgios 0–2
  Florian Mayer 0–3

*

Wins over top 10 players
He has a  record against players who were, at the time the match was played, ranked in the top 10.

*

ATP Tour career earnings

Exhibition finals

Singles

Notes

References

Tennis career statistics